This article lists all of the numbered county roads in Elgin County, Ontario, Canada.

References

Elgin
Transport in Elgin County